Simple Pleasures is an album by American banjoist Alison Brown, released in 1990. Produced by David Grisman and recorded with his David Grisman Quintet plus such stars as Mike Marshall, Alison Krauss and Turtle Island String Quartet violoncellist Mark Summer, this jazzy album delivers a hybrid-string sound with all tracks exclusively written by Alison Brown.

Reception 

In his Allmusic review, music critic Michael McCall wrote of the album "Her all-instrumental debut instantly earned respect among progressive acoustic music fans... she maintains an innate elegance amid the tricky arranging."

Track listing 
All compositions by Alison Brown
 "Mambo Banjo" – 3:58
 "Leaving Cottondale" – 2:35
 "Fantasy" – 2:25
 "Daytime TV" – 3:02
 "Wolf Moon" – 2:50
 "From the Coast" – 5:13
 "Weetabix" – 2:42
 "Bright And Early" – 2:45
 "Waltzing With Tula" – 3:01
 "Reddy Rooster" – 2:43
 "Sundaze" – 4:52
 "Simple Pleasures" – 2:49

Personnel
 Alison Brown – banjo, guitar
 Joe Craven – percussion
 David Grisman – mandolin
 Matt Eakle – flute
 Jim Kerwin– bass
 Alison Krauss – violin
 Mike Marshall – guitar
 Mark Summer – violoncello

References

1990 debut albums
Vanguard Records albums
Alison Brown albums